Alberich Rabensteiner  (28 January 1875 – 2 April 1945) was a Cistercian monk who practiced at Heiligenkreuz Abbey. He was also a prior and an administrator at Stift Neukloster, Wiener Neustadt, Austria.

Life 
Alois Rabensteiner entered the Cistercian Order in 1898 at Heiligenkreuz Abbey where he was given the name Alberich.  He made his perpetual Religious vows on 1 June 1903, and was ordained into the priesthood on 25 July 1903. After serving as chaplain at St. Valentin, he was sent to Stift Neukloster in Wiener Neustadt, where he founded the Sodality of Our Lady together with the future Father Eberhard Steinbauer. Father Alberich Rabensteiner was the parish priest in Sulz, Upper Austria, from 1910 to 1915. In September 1916 he became the parish priest for Gaaden. He was drafted for military service in 1916 at the height of World War I and acted as military chaplain in Wels, Upper Austria and later at the Italian Front in South Tyrol and at Bukovina.

In 1918 he was appointed as prior and administrator of Stift Neukloster as well as the Parish Priest of Neukloster. From 1922 onwards, he became dean of Wiener Neustadt and from 1934 became dean of Weigelsdorf, Ebreichsdorf. In the Martyrology Sancrucense, Rabensteiner is described as a religious firebrand, with a deep Marian spirituality. His desk calendar, which he used to record his thoughts, contains the entry "amo nesciri et pro nihil reputari“ (I love being unknown and to be thought of as nothing).

Death and Martyrdom
In the spring of 1945, Wiener Neustadt was subject to heavy air raids by the Allied Forces, killing many people. Although a large number of people fled from the city, Rabensteiner stayed and continued his duty. During Holy Week, as the Red Army advanced on Wiener Neustadt, Rabensteiner and the few remaining monks celebrated Mass in the sacristy or the basement of the already heavily damaged monastery. On Easter Monday, 2 April, the Red Army entered the city after heavy artillery bombardment and fights with the remaining German forces. Rabensteiner removed the bodies of fallen German soldiers from the street beside the monastery to prevent them being run over by Russian tanks. The following events cannot be reconstructed with certainty. One source, Adolf Höggerl, who had left Rabensteiner and based his later report on a secondary source, wrote that a Russian Officer had violently objected to the removal of the bodies and had rushed into the church shouting for the priest. A young woman fled screaming from the church, and Rabensteiner, who had heard her screams, quickly ran into the church. The other version of events (a written testimonial by Sr. M. Burgharda) claims that Rabensteiner hid a young woman, who was being pursued by a Russian soldier, in the kitchen and was seen talking to the soldier, who then followed him inside. 
Rabensteiner was found shot dead in front of the high altar of the church. He was buried by permission of the Russian Commandant in the cloister of Stift Neukloster.

Father Alberich Rabensteiner is named as a martyr in the Austrian martyrology of the twentieth century.

Further reading 
Lebenslauf des Gründers P. Alberich Rabensteiner. In: Sancta Crux 32 (1970) 72–79.
Johann Mandak: 50. Todestag P. Prior Alberich Rabensteiner. In: Sancta Crux 56 (1995) 164–173.
P. Alberich (Alois) Rabensteiner OCist, Prior und Administrator in Wr. Neustadt-Neukloster. In: Jan Mikrut (ed.): Blutzeugen des Glaubens. Martyrologium des 20. Jahrhunderts, Vol. 1, Vienna ²1999, pp. 197–205.
Adolf Höggerl: So starb P. Prior Alberich Rabensteiner. In: Sancta Crux (2000) 202–206.
Ekkart Sauser, « Rabensteiner, Alberich (1875-1945) ». In: Biographisch-Bibliographisches Kirchenlexikon 20, 2002, col. 1195.
Karl Wallner, Martyrologium Sancrucense. Heiligenverzeichnis für das Zisterzienserkloster Heiligenkreuz, 2 vol., Heiligenkreuz 2003, p. 121.

External links 
http://newsaints.faithweb.com/new_martyrs/Austria1.htm
http://austria-forum.org/af/AEIOU/Rabensteiner,_Alberich

References 

1875 births
1945 deaths
People from Villanders
Catholic people executed by the Soviet Union
Austrian Cistercians
Soviet World War II crimes
Austrian civilians killed in World War II
Austrian people executed by the Soviet Union
Deaths by firearm in Austria
World War I chaplains
Austro-Hungarian military personnel of World War I